James Thome Farm is a historic farm in Eighty Four, Pennsylvania. It consists of the Thome House, with the oldest section built c. 1810; two outbuildings, six contributing structures, and two ponds. The farm's architectural evolution, of Georgian-inspired, Greek Revival, and a 1950s vernacular wing is typical of other long-used farms in the Washington County area.

It is designated as a historic residential landmark/farmstead by the Washington County History & Landmarks Foundation, and is listed on the National Register of Historic Places.

References

Houses on the National Register of Historic Places in Pennsylvania
Georgian architecture in Pennsylvania
Houses completed in 1800
Houses in Washington County, Pennsylvania
National Register of Historic Places in Washington County, Pennsylvania